Mana mana may refer to:

Mana Mana, a Finnish rock group
Mah Nà Mah Nà (sometimes "Mana Mana" or "Mahna Mahna"), a popular song written by Piero Umiliani